Nationality words link to articles with information on the nation's poetry or literature (for instance, Irish or France).

Events
 January 10 – The Serampore Mission and Press is established in Serampore (now part of West Bengal) India by Baptist missionaries Joshua Marshman and William Ward. The press would grow into the largest in Asia, printing books in nearly every Indian language.
 October 3 – William and Dorothy Wordsworth, walking near Grasmere, encounter a leech gatherer who inspires his poem "Resolution and Independence", first written 18 months later and published in 1807.
William Blake begins 3 years residence in a cottage at Felpham in Sussex to illustrate the works of William Hayley; here he begins work on his poem Milton.

Works published

United Kingdom
 Christopher Anstey, Contentment; or, Hints to Servants on the Present Scarcity
 Robert Bloomfield, The Farmer's Boy, with engravings by Thomas Bewick; 15 editions by 1827
 Robert Burns, The Works of Robert Burns (posthumous)
 George Canning, editor, Poetry of the Anti-Jacobin, collection of poems which had appeared in the Anti-Jacobin magazine; four editions by 1801, London: J. Wright, anthology
 Joseph Cottle, Alfred
 William Gifford, Epistle to Peter Pindar, satire addressed to John Wolcot
 William Hayley, An Essay on Sculpture
 M. G. Lewis and others, Tales of Wonder, poems and fiction; includes "Glenfinlas" and other poems by Sir Walter Scott; published this year, although book states "1801"
 Thomas Moore, Odes of Anacreon
 William Sotheby:
 The Georgics of Virgil
 The Siege of Cuzco: A tragedy

United States
 William Cliffton, Poems, Chiefly Occasional, by the late Mr. Cliffton. To Which are Prefixed, Introductory Notices of the Life, Character and Writings, of the Author, and an Engraved Likeness, New York: Printed for J. W. Fenno, by G. & R. Waite, published posthumously

On the death of George Washington
 Richard Alsop, "A Poem, Sacred to the Memory of George Washington", dedicated to Martha Washington; among the most widely read of the many eulogies published in the United States on the death of Washington
 Charles Caldwell, An Elegiac Poem on the Death of General Washington
 John Blair Linn, The Death of Washington. A Poem. In Imitation of the Manner of Ossian. By Rev. John Blair Linn, Philadelphia: Printed by John Ormrod; a book-length poem criticized for treating Washington in the style of the Celtic poet
 Sacred Dirges, Hymns, and Anthems, Commemorative of the Death of General George Washington, The Guardian of His Country, and The Friend of Man. Born Feb. 22, 1732. Died, at Mount Vernon, Dec. 14, 1799. Aged 68. An Original Composition, including a poem by Susanna Haswell Rowson writing under the pseudonym "a citizen of Massachusetts", Boston: Printed at Boston, by I. Thomas and E. T. Andrews, anthology
 Hymns and Odes Composed on the Death of General George Washington, contributors include Thomas Paine, Charles Brockton Brown and Richard Alsop

Works published in other languages
 Pritharam Dvija, translator, Svargarohan Parva, translation into Assamese from the original Sanskrit of the last canto of the Mahabharata; India
 Christian Adolf Overbeck, translator, Anakreon und Sappho, from the original Ancient Greek of Anacreon and Sappho; Lubeck: F. Bohn

Births
Death years link to the corresponding "[year] in poetry" article:
 September 28 – Sibella Elizabeth Miles (died 1882), English poet, writer and schoolteacher
 October 14 – Charles Neaves (died 1876), Scottish judge and poet
 October 18 – Sir Henry Taylor (died 1884), English playwright, author and poet
 October 25 – Thomas Babington Macaulay (died 1859), English poet, historian and Whig politician of Scottish ancestry
 December 4 – Emil Aarestrup (died 1856), Danish
Also:
 c.1798–1800 – Charles Jeremiah Wells (died 1879), English
Asir Muzaffar Ali Khan (died 1861), Urdu-language Indian poet also writing in Persian and whose ghazals are compiled into six diwans
 Godavardhana (died 1851), Kerala-born Indian poet writing many of his poems in Sanskrit
 Mohammad Momin Khan, (died 1851), Indian, Urdu-language poet (surname: Momin)

Deaths
Birth years link to the corresponding "[year] in poetry" article:
 February 23 – Joseph Warton (born 1722), English poet and critic
 April 25 – William Cowper, pronounced "Cooper" (born 1731), English poet and hymn writer
 June 29 – Abraham Gotthelf Kästner (born 1719), German
 September 29 – Michael Denis (born 1729), Austrian writer, poet, translator, librarian and zoologist
 December 26 – Mary Robinson (born 1757), English actress, poet, dramatist, novelist and royal mistress
 Also:
 Arnimal (birth year not known), Indian, Kashmiri poet; a woman
 Eibhlín Dubh Ní Chonaill (born 1743), Irish noblewoman and poet, composer of Caoineadh Airt Uí Laoghaire

See also

 Poetry
 List of years in poetry
 18th century in poetry
 19th century in poetry
 List of years in literature
 18th century in literature
 19th century in literature
 Romantic poetry
 Golden Age of Russian Poetry (1800–1850)
 Weimar Classicism period in Germany, commonly considered to have begun in 1788  and to have ended either in 1805, with the death of Friedrich Schiller, or 1832, with the death of Goethe

Notes

 "A Timeline of English Poetry" Web page of the Representative Poetry Online Web site, University of Toronto

18th-century poetry
Poetry